United States v. McBratney, 104 U.S. 621 (1881), was a United States Supreme Court case in which the Court held that upon the admission of Colorado as a state, there being no reservation to the United States of jurisdiction over the Indian territory within the state limits, that the United States circuit court for the district of Colorado had no jurisdiction over the murder of one white man by another in the Ute reservation in said state.

Background 
McBratney was convicted of the murder of Thomas Casey on the Ute Reservation in Colorado.  Following conviction, McBratney appealed claiming that the federal courts did not have jurisdiction to try a white man for the murder of another white man on an Indian reservation.  On appeal, the circuit court could not come to an agreement and issued a certificate of division.

Supreme Court 
Justice Horace Gray delivered the opinion of the court.  Gray stated that although the treaty with the Utes provided for federal jurisdiction, the act of Congress creating the state of Colorado did not reserve federal jurisdiction over Indian reservations.  He noted that in the past, Congress had explicitly reserved such lands and jurisdiction, as in the case of Kansas.  The federal court would still have jurisdiction for crimes committed against Indians by whites, or vice versa, but the state otherwise had jurisdiction.

Subsequent developments 
Since the decision, every state that has been admitted, with the exception of Hawaii, has been required to acknowledge federal jurisdiction over reservation lands.

References

External links
 

1881 in United States case law
United States Constitution Article Four case law
United States Native American criminal jurisdiction case law
United States Supreme Court cases
United States Supreme Court cases of the Waite Court
Murder trials
Ute tribe
Native American history of Colorado